S. Joy Mountford is an internationally recognized leader in the field of computer-human interaction or interface design. From 1986 to 1994, she was Head of the Human Interface Group at Apple Computer where she invented, among other things, the initial use of QuickTime. In 2012, Mountford won the Lifetime Practice Award from SIGCHI and was invited to join the CHI Academy. She was given an Osher Fellowship Award at the Exploratorium in San Francisco. In 2019, she received the Mission College Women Leadership award.

Career

Mountford received her Bachelor of Science in Cognitive Psychology from University College London, then received a scholarship to study Engineering Psychology at the University of Illinois. Her graduate work was in multi-modal models of information processing. 

She began her career in Aviation at Honeywell Systems Research Center designing speech recognition systems, stereographic helmet displays, and automated flight controls for B52, RF4, and F-16/18. She continued Artificial Intelligence research efforts at Microelectronics Computer Consortium (MCC) in Austin, Texas as a project leader of the Visual Metaphors team.

Mountford moved to California to establish the first Apple Human Interface Group. This team nurtured interdisciplinary teams of artists and scientists to practice user experience and design, initiating what is now referred to as 'Design Thinking'. At Apple her team became highly influential by teaching and training a new generation of designers at international schools such as RCA, Stanford, NYU, UCB, CMU, IIT,  and many others. This program was named the International Design Expo; it ran for over 20 years and had various corporate sponsors. This had a huge impact on creating the next generation of interdisciplinary design innovators in both education and industry.

At Apple many of the team’s interface ideas were seminal, media-based and came to life in current Apple products. In 2020 ‘stacks’ was released as part of system software, which was based on the work performed in the Human Interface Group in 1992. Additional projects were SonicFinder, Transition Factory, Photologger, Quicktime VR, and Bubble Help in derivative forms. During her Apple tenure Mountford also completed a Management Business Program at INSEAD Business School. 

Mountford was a senior project lead at Interval Research (Paul Allen’s research company) focusing on Soundscapes using both physical objects and software to compose non-notational audio scapes. In addition, her team built printable internet-aware books serving as new interactive experiences. Some of this work made its way into products of toy companies like Lego and Mattel, under her own company.

As a VP of User Experience Design at Yahoo!, her work focused on bringing data to use through data visualizations. These were installed as some of the first ever realtime 3D data visualisations on the building walls. Examples were real time travel of mail around the world, as well as live uploads of digital photos across the world from Flickr. Mountford was also a UX product leader of several Y! properties, including the data innovation team in San Francisco. After Yahoo!, Mountford worked for Akamai Technologies, the largest CDN. In 2012 she established both east and west User Experience and Design teams. In 2015, she became the Interface Practice Lead for the Advanced UX team at Ford Motor Company's Innovation and Research Center in Palo Alto, California, working in digital agency and sonic experiences.

Mountford has over 30 granted patents, most in the areas of visual and audio interface technology. She continues to consult to companies and present innovative talks worldwide.

She teaches invited classes at Singularity University, TEDx, CCA, UCB, NYU. She is also Board member of Future of Talent and an elected member of the National Committee of Momentum. 

She has a dozen or so published articles in ACM's Digital Library.

References

Living people
Year of birth missing (living people)